The 2012–13 Southern Jaguars basketball team represented Southern University during the 2012–13 NCAA Division I men's basketball season. The Jaguars, led by second year head coach Roman Banks, played their home games at the F. G. Clark Center and were members of the Southwestern Athletic Conference. They finished the season 23–10, 15–3 in SWAC play to finish in a tie for second place. They were champions of the SWAC tournament to earn an automatic bid to the 2013 NCAA tournament where they lost in the second round to Gonzaga.

Roster

Schedule

|-
!colspan=9| Regular season

|-
!colspan=9| 2013 SWAC tournament

|-
!colspan=9|2013 NCAA tournament

References

Southern Jaguars basketball seasons
Southern
Southern
South
South